Robert Pruitt is an American politician and businessman from Georgia. Pruitt served as a Republican member of the Georgia House of Representatives for District 149 from January 2021 to January 2023.

Early life

Robert Pruitt was born in Fort Bragg, North Carolina. His parents were serving in the U.S. Army at the time of his birth and were stationed at Fort Bragg. Throughout the course of his childhood, Pruitt lived in Germany; Oklahoma; Orlando, Florida; Augusta, Georgia; Japan; and Chauncey, Georgia. Pruitt has lived in Georgia for the majority of his life.

Education

Pruitt attended Heart of Georgia Technical Institute in Eastman and obtained a diploma in Flight Technology in 1997. He was a member of the first graduating class of this institute. Pruitt attended Middle Georgia College and obtained a degree of Associate of Applied Science in 1997 also. In 2000, Pruitt obtained a Bachelors of Science degree in Professional Aeronautics from Embry-Riddle Aeronautical University.

Career 
Pruitt is a pilot, pilot instructor, businessman, and entrepreneur. Pruitt serves as chief executive officer and President of SoPoly Outdoor Furniture.

On June 9, 2020, Pruitt won the Republican primary election and was unopposed in the general election on November 3, 2020, therefore he became a Republican member of Georgia House of Representatives for District 149.

On January 11, 2021, Pruitt was sworn in as a member of the Georgia House of Representatives for District 149 succeeding Jimmy Pruett.

Pruitt serves as a member of the House Economic Development & Tourism Committee, the House Industry and Labor Committee, & the House Small Business and Development Committee.

On January 9, 2023, he left office and Danny Mathis replaced him.

Personal life 
Pruitt's wife is Kelly Rogers Pruitt. They have three children. Pruitt and his family reside in Eastman, Georgia.

References

External links 
 Robert Pruitt at ballotpedia.org
 Robert Pruitt at ds2.com
 Robert Pruitt at facebook.com

Republican Party members of the Georgia House of Representatives
21st-century American politicians
Living people
Year of birth missing (living people)